Camilo Andrés Gainza Bernal (born 9 May 1993) is a Chilean footballer that currently plays for Santiago Morning in the Primera B de Chile.

Club career
Camilo did all lower in Universidad Católica but his debut was in Curicó Unido.

External links

1993 births
Living people
Chilean footballers
Primera B de Chile
Club Deportivo Universidad Católica footballers
Curicó Unido footballers
A.C. Barnechea footballers
Deportes Iquique footballers
Deportes La Serena footballers
Deportes Concepción (Chile) footballers
Association football midfielders